St. Joseph's Church (also Church of St. Joseph) is the name of numerous churches that are named for Saint Joseph, some of which are located in:

For a complete list, see List of churches named after Saint Joseph

China 
 St. Joseph's Church, Beijing

England 
 St Joseph's Church, Birkdale
 St Joseph's Church, Brighton
 St Joseph's Church, Dorking
 St Joseph's Church, Preston

France 
 St. Joseph's Church, Le Havre

India 
 St. Joseph's Church, Juhu
 St. Joseph's Pilgrim Church, Peringuzha, Muvattupuzha, Kerala

Ireland 
 St. Joseph's Church, East Wall, Dublin
 Church of St. Joseph, Milltownpass, County Westmeath
Church of St. Joseph, Ballinagar, County Offaly

Poland 
 Church of St. Joseph of the Visitationists (Visitationist Church)

United States 
 Church of St. Joseph (Bronxville, New York)
 Church of St. Joseph (Elmer, Minnesota)
 Church of St. Joseph (Los Banos, California)
 Church of St. Joseph in Greenwich Village, New York
 Church of St. Joseph of Arimathea, New York
 Church of St. Joseph (Browerville, Minnesota)
 Church of St. Joseph (St. Joseph, Minnesota)
 St. Joseph's Church (Bronx, New York)
 St. Joseph's Church (Millbrook, New York)
 St. Joseph's Church, Chinatown (Manhattan)
 St. Joseph of the Holy Family Church (New York City)

See also 
 Saint Joseph
 Saint Joseph (disambiguation)
 Saint Joseph's (disambiguation)
 St Joseph's Day
 St. Joseph's Cathedral (disambiguation)
 Cathedral Basilica of St. Joseph (disambiguation)